This was the first edition of the tournament. Raven Klaasen and Rajeev Ram won the title, defeating Pablo Carreño Busta and Mariusz Fyrstenberg in the final, 7−6(7-2), 7−5.

Seeds

Draw

Draw

References
 Main Draw

Chengdu Open - Doubles
2016 Doubles
2016 in Chinese tennis